South African Jews in Israel are immigrants and descendants of the immigrants of the South African Jewish communities, who now reside within the state of Israel. They number around 20,000.

History
A number of South African Jews settled in Israel, forming a South African community in Israel. Perhaps the most famous South African community founded in Israel is Savyon, which remains the wealthiest suburb in Israel. Large houses were built in the style that the community was accustomed to from their life in South Africa, each with a pool, and developed around a country club.

Notable people
Abba Eban
Danny Amos
Adi Bielski
Leo Camron
Maxine Fassberg, CEO Intel Israel
Mervyn Gotsman
David Schneider (tennis)
Benjamin Pogrund
Morris Kahn

See also 

Israel–South Africa relations
History of the Jews in South Africa
Lemba people

References 

 

Israeli Jews by national origin

Israel–South Africa relations